The 2002 NCAA Division III football season, part of the college football season organized by the NCAA at the Division III level in the United States, began in August 2002, and concluded with the NCAA Division III Football Championship, also known as the Stagg Bowl, in December 2002 at Salem Football Stadium in Salem, Virginia. The Mount Union Purple Raiders won their seventh, and third consecutive, Division III championship by defeating the Trinity (TX) Tigers, 48−7.

The Gagliardi Trophy, given to the most outstanding player in Division III football, was awarded to Dan Pugh, running back from Mount Union.

Conference standings

Conference champions

Postseason
The 2002 NCAA Division III Football Championship playoffs were the 30th annual single-elimination tournament to determine the national champion of men's NCAA Division III college football. The championship Stagg Bowl game was held at Salem Football Stadium in Salem, Virginia for the 10th time. This was the fourth bracket to feature 28 teams since last expanding in 1999.

Playoff bracket

* Overtime

See also
2002 NCAA Division I-A football season
2002 NCAA Division I-AA football season
2002 NCAA Division II football season

References